Combe is a village near Yealmpton in the county of Devon, England.

References

Villages in Devon